Andrea Servi (12 June 1984 – 22 August 2013) was an Italian professional footballer who played as a defender.

Career
Servi was born in Rome. He began his football career with the youth teams of A.S. Roma, before playing at senior level for Salernitana, Vittoria, Giulianova, Sambenedettese, Giacomense, Pro Vasto, Nocerina, Ebolitana and Lupa Roma.

Death
Servi died in Milan of lung cancer at the age of 29.

References
Infobox statistics
 
General

1984 births
2013 deaths
Footballers from Rome
Italian footballers
Association football defenders
A.S. Roma players
U.S. Salernitana 1919 players
F.C. Vittoria players
Giulianova Calcio players
A.S. Sambenedettese players
A.C. Giacomense players
Vastese Calcio 1902 players
A.S.G. Nocerina players
S.S. Ebolitana 1925 players
Lupa Roma F.C. players
Deaths from lung cancer in Lombardy